Eressa dohertyi is a moth of the family Erebidae. It was described by Walter Rothschild in 1910. It is found on the Lesser Sunda Islands of Maritime Southeast Asia.

References

Eressa
Moths described in 1910